Rhyl Kingston Hinwood (born 1940) is a sculptor in Brisbane, Queensland, Australia. She designed and produced over seven hundred commissioned public artworks. In 2006 she became a Member of the Order of Australia for "service to the arts as a sculptor of artworks for public places and buildings, and through teaching roles and support for students".

Early life 
Rhyl Hinwood (birth name Rhyl Jones) was born in Brisbane in 1940. She attended Yeronga State School and Somerville House. She studied art at the Central Technical College, under instructors such as George Virine.

Artistic career 
Hinwood worked as an artist in the Queensland Natural History Museum for four years. In 1976, she won a national competition to complete the set of carvings on the Great Court of University of Queensland and has since completed over 250 works for the university. In addition to the work in the Great Court, she also carved the sculptures for the university's Wordsmiths Cafe using themes inspired by the University of Queensland Press.

In 1986, Hinwood won a Winston Churchill Memorial Fellowship for sculpture.

In 1987 she was chosen to create the ceramic Australian Coat of Arms for the House of Representatives in Parliament House, Canberra, Australian Capital Territory. This was the first art work commissioned and completed for Australia's new parliament house.

A documentary in 1993 entitled In pursuit of excellence, celebrated the work of Hinwood.

References

External links 

 

1940 births
Living people
20th-century Australian sculptors
21st-century Australian sculptors
Australian women sculptors
20th-century Australian women artists
21st-century Australian women artists